Kalaito Pombero is a 1981 novel by Paraguayan writer Tadeo Zarratea (born 1946). It is one of the first novels to be ever written in the Guarani language, preceded just a year earlier by Mitã rerahaha (written by Juan Maidana).

References

External links 
 Kalaito Pombero at WorldCat
 Excerpts from the book 

Paraguayan novels
1981 novels
Guarani-language literature